Bradley Andrew Goldberg (born February 21, 1990) is an American former professional baseball pitcher. He played in Major League Baseball (MLB) for the Chicago White Sox.

In high school, Goldberg was a 2008 preseason Baseball America All-American, 2008 First Team All-Ohio, and the 2008 MVP of the Chagrin Valley Conference. In college in 2013, his senior year at Ohio State University, he was an All-Big Ten third-team selection.  Selected by the Chicago White Sox in the 10th round of the 2013 MLB draft, that year Baseball America named him "Closest To The Majors" (with Tyler Danish) and "Best Fastball in the White Sox draft class". In 2016, he was an International League All Star with the Charlotte Knights in Class AAA. His fastball reaches 99 mph.

Goldberg pitched for Israel at the 2017 World Baseball Classic qualifier, saving Team Israel's first two games. He left spring training with the Chicago White Sox to join and pitch for Team Israel in the second round of the 2017 World Baseball Classic in Japan, in March 2017.

Early and personal life
Goldberg was born in Cleveland, Ohio, to Marla Goldberg and Bryan Goldberg, lives in Beachwood, Ohio, and is Jewish. He has two younger twin brothers, Rob and Todd. He went to Hebrew school and had his bar mitzvah at Anshe Chesed Fairmount Temple in Beachwood. Goldberg graduated from Beachwood High School.

High school
Goldberg attended Beachwood High School in Beachwood, Ohio, outside of Cleveland, graduating in 2008.  Playing baseball for the school, he was 5–1 with a school record 64 strikeouts as a junior, and 9–2 with a 1.64 earned run average and 102 strikeouts as a senior; that season he also batted .450 with 35 RBIs.

He was 2008 First Team All-Ohio, was All-Chagrin Valley Conference all four years, and as a senior Goldberg was the 2008 Most Valuable Player of the Chagrin Valley Conference. He was also a 2008 preseason All-American by Baseball America and Under Armour, a two-time All-Sun Press Southeast Pitcher, and a Cleveland Plain Dealer Player of the Week in 2006. He was named to the Beachwood Hall of Fame. Steve Baraona, who coached Goldberg at Beachwood High School, believes Goldberg is the first Beachwood player to be picked in the MLB draft. His catcher had a major impact on his high school career, Tyler Margolin. Margolin caught a no hitter for Goldberg in 2006.

College
Goldberg was recruited by and enrolled at Coastal Carolina University in Conway, South Carolina, to play college baseball for the Coastal Carolina Chanticleers, and initially majored in Sports Management.  He played for Coastal Carolina in 2009 and 2010, making 18 appearances (17 in relief) in those two seasons. In the summer of 2009 he played college summer baseball for the North Coast Knights, was ranked the No. 6 prospect in the Prospect League, and was named to the league's All Star team.

He then transferred to Ohio State University, to play for the Ohio State Buckeyes, switching his major to Sociology.  Goldberg sat out the 2011 season in accordance with transfer "redshirt" rules, but also missed the 2012 season because most of his credits did not transfer, rendering him academically ineligible.

Goldberg pitched for the Buckeyes as a starter in 2013, and was 6–1 with a 2.99 earned run average in 15 starts.  He was an All-Big Ten third-team selection, and was twice named Big Ten Pitcher of the Week. In college, he threw his fastball in the mid-90s, relied heavily on a sinking fastball, had a very good slider in the 82-84 mph range, and threw a 76-78 mph curveball.

Minor leagues

Chicago White Sox
Goldberg was selected by the Chicago White Sox in the 10th round of the 2013 MLB draft.  White Sox assistant scouting director Nick Hostetler, who saw Goldberg in college, said: "A big, strong power-arm guy, with a live fastball. He's going to be a guy who can flash a breaking ball every now and then. I loved ... the competitiveness." When he was drafted, Goldberg was still one semester and an internship short of earning his college degree.

In 2013, Goldberg was 3–0 with a 1.54 ERA and 3 saves, and averaged 12.6 strikeouts per 9.0 IP, in 14 relief appearances with the Advanced Rookie Great Falls Voyagers of the Pioneer League, Class A Kannapolis Intimidators of the South Atlantic League, and A-Advanced Winston-Salem Dash of the Carolina League.  Baseball America named him "Closest To The Majors" (with Tyler Danish) and "Best Fastball in the White Sox draft class".

In early 2014 White Sox assistant general manager Buddy Bell said: "We like his arm. He's got some sink. Big, [Curt] Schilling-type looking body." That season Goldberg was 4–4 with a 5.23 ERA with Winston-Salem, as he pitched in 35 games, including 7 starts.

In 2015, pitching for the Winston-Salem Dash, Goldberg was 1–4 in 39 games with a 2.97 ERA, and 11 saves (tied for 4th in the league) in 12 opportunities, and struck out 58 batters in 57.2 innings, all in relief. In the Fall of 2015, Goldberg finished his coursework for his college degree, and graduated in December with an Ohio State University Sociology degree.

Goldberg began the 2016 season with the Birmingham Barons of the Class AA Southern League, for whom he was 0–0 with a 1.50 ERA, and was promoted to the Charlotte Knights of the Class AAA International League for whom he was 3–5 with a 2.84 ERA and 10 saves (a team high) in 11 opportunities as the team's closer, in 43 relief appearances.  He was Charlotte's lone 2016 mid-season International League All Star. His fastball was reaching 99 mph. The White Sox added him to their 40-man roster after the season.

In 2017, Goldberg threw the most innings in spring training for the White Sox without allowing a run, 4.2 innings (not counting his 2 scoreless innings in the World Baseball Classic). With the Charlotte Knights, his fastball touched 99 mph, he threw a heavy cutter or two-seam fastball in the low 90s, his slider was in the mid-to-upper 80s range, and he threw a changeup.  Pitching for them in 2017 he was 3–2 with a 3.35 ERA, 5 saves, and 47 strikeouts over 40.1 innings.

He began the 2018 season pitching for the Birmingham Barons. He had a 2.82 ERA with 32 strikeouts in 22.1 innings of relief, before he was traded.

Arizona Diamondbacks
On June 3, 2018, Goldberg was traded to the Arizona Diamondbacks in exchange for cash considerations. In 2018 for the Jackson Generals of the Southern League, he was 2–1 with 4 saves and an 0.64 ERA, and had 24 strikeouts in 14 innings while giving up only 4 hits. He was released from the organization on March 14, 2019.

Major leagues

Chicago White Sox (2017)
Goldberg was called up to the major league White Sox in June 2017, after achieving a record to that point in 2017 of 2–1 with a 1.99 ERA, four saves, and 22 strikeouts over 17 games with the Charlotte Knights. He made his major league debut on June 3, giving up four runs in a third of an inning, and was sent back down to Charlotte.  He was recalled on July 19, and pitched a total of 12 innings for the team.

Team Israel
Goldberg pitched for Israel at the 2017 World Baseball Classic qualifier. He picked up saves in Team Israel's first two games. During the first game Goldberg threw 21 pitches while recording all 3 outs in the ninth inning, giving up a hit and a walk, while recording two strikeouts. The next day Goldberg faced the minimum number of batters on 11 pitches with a strikeout, for his second save.

Goldberg left spring training with the Chicago White Sox to join and pitch for  Team Israel in the second round of the 2017 World Baseball Classic in Japan, in March 2017. He pitched in two games, pitching 2 scoreless innings.

Coaching career
In October 2019, Goldberg returned to the Ohio State Buckeyes baseball team as their Director of Pitching Development.

On February 7, 2023, Goldberg was named pitching coach of the Akron RubberDucks, the Double-A affiliate of the Cleveland Guardians.

See also
List of select Jewish Major League Baseball players

References

External links

1990 births
Living people
2017 World Baseball Classic players
Baseball coaches from Ohio
Baseball players from Cleveland
Birmingham Barons players
Charlotte Knights players
Chicago White Sox players
Coastal Carolina Chanticleers baseball players
Great Falls Voyagers players
Jackson Generals (Southern League) players
Jewish American baseball players
Jewish Major League Baseball players
Kannapolis Intimidators players
Major League Baseball pitchers
Ohio State Buckeyes baseball coaches
Ohio State Buckeyes baseball players
People from Beachwood, Ohio
Winston-Salem Dash players
21st-century American Jews
Eau Claire Express players